Joel Shapiro (born September 27, 1941 New York City, New York) is an American sculptor renowned for his dynamic work composed of simple rectangular shapes. The artist is classified as a Minimalist as demonstrated in his works, which were mostly defined through the materials used, without allusions to subjects outside of the works. He lives and works in New York City. He is married to the artist Ellen Phelan.

Early life and education
Joel Shapiro grew up in Sunnyside, Queens, New York. He graduated from Bayside High School (Bayside, NY) in 1959, at which time the school’s yearbook awarded him the title of Man About Town.   When he was twenty two he lived in India for two years while in the Peace Corps. He received a B.A. in 1964 and an M.A. in 1969 from New York University

Work and inspiration
While serving his Peace Corp time in India, Shapiro saw many Indian art works, and has said that "India gave me the sense of … the possibility of being an artist." In India "Art was pervasive and integral to the society", and he has said that "the struggle in my work to find a structure that reflects real psychological states may well use Indian sculpture as a model." His early work, which also drew inspiration from Greek art, is characterized by some by its small size, but Shapiro has discounted this perception, describing his early works as, "all about scale and the small size was an aspect of their scale". He described scale as "A very active thing that's changing and altering as time unfolds, consciously or unconsciously," and, "a relationship of size and an experience. You can have something small that has big scale." In these works he said that he was trying "to describe an emotional state, my own longing or desire". He also said that during this early period in his career he was interested in the strategies of artists Robert Morris, Richard Serra, Carl Andre, and Donald Judd.

By the 1980s, Shapiro began to explore larger and life-size forms in pieces that were still reminiscent of Indian and Greek sculpture but also inspired by the early modernist works by Edgar Degas and Constantin Brâncusi. The bulk of these pieces have been commissioned or acquired by museums and galleries. Later, Shapiro further expanded his repertoire by creating pieces that depicted the dynamism of human form. For instance, his subjects were portrayed in the act of dancing, crouching, and falling, among others that explored the themes of balance, cantilever, projection, and compression. His later works can have the appearance of flying, being impossibly suspended in space, and/or defying gravity. He has said about this shift in his work that he "wanted to make work that stood on its own, and wasn't limited by architecture and by the ground and the wall and right angles." These can be demonstrated in the case of the large-size outdoor art he made for the Hood Museum of Art. The bronze piece was an attenuated form that leans over a walkway and its near-falling form is viewed as an energizing element in the museum's courtyard. This sculpture, like all of Shapiro's mature works, are untitled.

Works in collections

United States

California

 Untitled, 1978, San Diego Museum of Contemporary Art, La Jolla
 Untitled, 1974, Gersh, Philip & Beatrice, Los Angeles
 Untitled, 1988, Gersh, Philip & Beatrice, Los Angeles
 Untitled, 1981, Museum of Contemporary Art, Los Angeles
 Untitled, 1979, Museum of Contemporary Art, Los Angeles
 Untitled, 1982, Museum of Contemporary Art, Los Angeles
 Untitled, 1975, Museum of Contemporary Art, Los Angeles
 Untitled, 1988, Fine Arts Museums of San Francisco, San Francisco
 Untitled,  1982-1985, J. Paul Getty Museum, Los Angeles

District of Columbia
 Untitled, 1989, National Gallery of Art, Washington
 Untitled, 1974, National Gallery of Art, Washington
 Untitled, 1975, National Gallery of Art, Washington
 Untitled, 1975, National Gallery of Art, Washington
 Untitled, 1983, National Gallery of Art, Washington
 Untitled, 1986, Hirshhorn Museum and Sculpture Garden, Washington
 Loss and Regeneration, 1993, United States Holocaust Memorial Museum, Washington

Florida
 Untitled, 1996, Boca Raton Museum of Art, Boca Raton
 Untitled, 1988, Boca Raton Museum of Art, Boca Raton
 Up/Over, 2007, Norton Museum of Art, West Palm Beach

Illinois
 Untitled, 1984, Elliott, Gerald S., Chicago
 Untitled (Arching Figure), 1985, Elliott, Gerald S., Chicago
 Untitled (for G.S.E.), 1987, Elliott, Gerald S., Chicago
 Untitled, 1981, Governors State University, University Park

Indiana
 Untitled, 1984, David Owsley Museum of Art, Indiana

Iowa
 Untitled, 2003, Principal Riverwalk, Des Moines
 Untitled, 1985, Pappajohn Sculpture Park, Des Moines

Maine
 Untitled, 1984, Colby College, Museum of Art, Waterville

Maryland
 Untitled, 1985, Baltimore Museum of Art, Baltimore
 Untitled, 1970, Baltimore Museum of Art, Baltimore

Massachusetts
 Untitled, 1990, Fogg Art Museum, Harvard University, Cambridge

Michigan
 Untitled, 1975, Detroit Institute of Arts, Detroit
 Untitled, 1985, Detroit Institute of Arts, Detroit

Minnesota
 Untitled, 1975, Minneapolis Institute of Art (Mia), Minneapolis

Missouri
 Untitled, 1984, St. Louis Art Museum, St. Louis
 Untitled, 1991, Nelson-Atkins Museum, Kansas City

Nebraska
 Untitled, 1984, University of Nebraska-Lincoln, Sheldon Memorial Art Gallery and Garden,

New York
 Seven Elements, 2001–2003, Albany Institute of History and Art, Albany
 Untitled, 1988, Museum of Modern Art, NYC
 Untitled, 1988, Museum of Modern Art, NYC
 Untitled (house on shelf), 1974, Museum of Modern Art, NYC
 Untitled, 1994, Sony Plaza, NYC - Donated by Sony Corporation of America to Storm King Art Center on April 19, 2016
 Untitled (House on Field), 1976, Whitney Museum of American Art, NYC
 Untitled, 1978, Whitney Museum of American Art, NYC
 Untitled, 1981, Whitney Museum of American Art, NYC
 Untitled, 2000, Rockefeller University, New York
 Untitled, 2004–2005, Albany Academy for Girls, Albany, NY

North Carolina
 Untitled, 1990, North Carolina Museum of Art
 Untitled, 1995, Davidson College, Van Every/ Smith Galleries

Ohio
 Untitled, University of Cincinnati Galleries, Ohio
 Untitled, 1977, Cincinnati Art Museum, Cincinnati, Ohio
 Untitled, 1989, Cleveland Museum of Art, Cleveland, Ohio

Pennsylvania
 Untitled maquette, 1984, CIGNA Museum and Art Collection, Philadelphia
 Untitled, 1984, CIGNA Museum and Art Collection, Philadelphia

Texas
 Untitled, 1975, Dallas Museum of Art, Dallas
 Untitled, 1975, Nasher Sculpture Center, Dallas
 Untitled, 1984, Nasher Sculpture Center, Dallas
 Untitled, 1985–87, Nasher Sculpture Center, Dallas
 Untitled, 1986, Nasher Sculpture Center, Dallas
 Untitled, 1986, Nasher Sculpture Center, Dallas
 Untitled, 1996–99, Nasher Sculpture Center, Dallas
 Untitled, 1977, Fort Worth Art Museum, Fort Worth
 Untitled, 1977, Fort Worth Art Museum, Fort Worth
 Untitled, 1990, Museum of Fine Arts, Houston
 Untitled, 2000, McNay Art Museum, San Antonio
 "Elements", 2004-2005, Northpark Center, Dallas, Texas
 Untitled, 2011, Rice University Art Gallery, Houston
 Untitled, 2019, UT Southwestern Medical Center, Dallas

Washington
 Untitled, 1980–81, Western Washington University Public Sculpture Collection, Bellingham, Washington
 Untitled, 1980–81, Restricted Owner, Seattle, Washington
 Untitled, 1990, Seattle University campus

Wisconsin
 Untitled, 1987, Milwaukee Art Museum, Milwaukee, Wisconsin

International collections

Australia
 Untitled (chair), 1974, Australian National Gallery, Canberra

Canada
 Conjunction, 1999, Embassy of the United States of America, Ottawa

Denmark
 Louisiana Museum of Modern Art, Humlebaek
Note: Joel Shapiro's sculpture name is unknown in the Denmark section, so the name of the sculpture isn't there.

Germany
 Untitled, 1999, Köln Skulpture Park, Cologne

Israel
 Untitled, 1991, Tel Aviv Museum of Art, Tel Aviv
 Untitled, 1996, Billy Rose Art Garden, Israel Museum, Jerusalem

Italy
 Untitled, 1993, Peggy Guggenheim collection, Venice

Netherlands
 Untitled, 1999, Beeldenroute Westersingel, Rotterdam

Sweden
 Untitled, 1979, Moderna Museet, Stockholm
 Untitled, 1982, Moderna Museet, Stockholm

United Kingdom
 Untitled, 1978, Tate Gallery, London
 Untitled, 1984, Tate Gallery, London

References

Untitled, Joel Shapiro, Getty Museum Website,
Untitled, Joel Shapiro, Greater Des Moines Public Art Foundation

Further reading
 Marshall, Richard and Smith, Robert. (1982) Joel Shapiro. Whitney Museum of American Art. 
 Institute Research Information System - Joel Shapiro
 H. Teicher: Joel Shapiro. Sculpture and drawings. New York, 1998
 "Notable Former Volunteers / Arts and Literature". Peace Corps official site. Accessed 5 January 2007.

External links

The Pace Gallery
Shapiro biography and images at L.A. Louver gallery
Interview with the Brooklyn Rail from November 2007
Public Art Fund: Joel Shapiro
Interview in Portland
Joel Shapiro in conversation with Marla Prather. https://vimeo.com/12436010  May 2010.

American printmakers
Peace Corps volunteers
Living people
1941 births
Artists from New York City
Steinhardt School of Culture, Education, and Human Development alumni
Sculptors from New York (state)
Members of the Royal Swedish Academy of Arts
Members of the American Academy of Arts and Letters